Ilyās ibn al-Qassīs Ḥannā al-Mawṣilī, also known as Elias of Babylon was a late 17th century Syriac Christian priest and author. Originally from Baghdad, Ottoman Empire, though his name in Arabic implies his family was from Mosul. An ethnic Assyrian, He was a member of the Chaldean Catholic Church. He is known for his accounts of his travels in Western Europe and the Spanish colonies in the New World, which is considered to be the oldest record in Arabic-language literature devoted to the Americas. He was named Don Elías de Babilonia by the Spaniards.

His manuscripts were rediscovered in the library of the Syriac Catholic Church's Archdiocese of Aleppo around 1900 by the Lebanese Jesuit Antoine Rabbath, who published the texts in the Arabic-language Catholic journal Al-Machriq between 1905 and 1906. The handwritten account is composed of 269 pages and contains his voyage to the New World, being followed by the history of the discovery and the conquest of America by the Spaniards. Another manuscript of the text is located in the India Office Library in London (MS 719), and it is known that several manuscripts existed in the libraries of Iraq before the Iraq War.

See also 
Tarih-i Hind-i garbi

References 

Nicanor Domíngo Faura, "Reverend Elias al-Mûsili : A Chaldean Arab Traveler in Seventeenth-Century Charcas (1678-79)", Bolivian Studies Journal (Urbana, Illinois), vol. 13, 2006, p. 254-272.
John-Paul A. Ghobrial, "The Secret Life of Elias of Babylon and the Uses of Global Microhistory", Past and Present 222, 2014, p. 51–93.

People from Baghdad
17th-century people from the Ottoman Empire